Euphorbia bourgaeana is a species of flowering plant in the spurge family Euphorbiaceae. It is native to Tenerife in the Canary Islands.

Description
It can grow to a height of 6–10 feet (1.82-3.04 metres), but if potted, it can be kept relatively small. The plant grows well in USDA zones 9b-11.

Like many euphorbias, parts of the plants are poisonous if ingested.

References

External links

bourgaeana
Garden plants
Endemic flora of the Canary Islands
Taxa named by Jaques Étienne Gay
Taxa named by Pierre Edmond Boissier
Taxobox binomials not recognized by IUCN